The 2011–12 Hazfi Cup was the 25th season of the Iranian football knockout competition. Persepolis were the defending champion but were eliminated by Esteghlal in the quarter-finals; The fourth consecutive wins for Esteghlal against Persepolis in official matches. The competition began on September 12, 2011 and was end on March 15, 2012. Esteghlal beat Shahin Bushehr 4–1 on penalties and was qualified for the group stage of the 2013 AFC Champions League.

Participating teams
Totally 100 teams participate in the 2011–12 season. These teams are divided into three main groups which are introduced here.

Group 1  (Start their matches from the first/second round)

 In total 34 teams (31 teams from 31 different provinces in Iran (each province: one), 1 additional team from Tehran province, 1 team from Kish, and 1 team from Khoramshahr.

 1- Shahin Karaj (Alborz Province)
 2- Omid Khalkhal (Ardabil Province)
 3- Mosatafa-lou Azerbaijan Sharqi (Azerbaijan Sharqi Province)
 4- Shahrdari Naghadeh (Azerbaijan Gharbi Province)
 5- Sepahan Khurouj Bushehr (Bushehr Province)
 6- Shahin Dehno Kuhrang (Chahar Mahaal and Bakhtiari Province)
 7- Oghab Shiraz (Fars Province)
 8- Shahrdari Chaboksar (Gilan Province)
 9- Kimia Aqqala (Golestan Province)
 10- Nosazi Madares Hamedan (Hamadan Province)
 11- Hadaf Minab (Hormozgan Province)
 12- Bahman Ilam (Ilam Province)
 13- Yaran Omid Fooladshahr (Isfahan Province)
 14- Shahid Mahan Kerman (Kerman Province)
 15- Mahan Kermanshah (Kermanshah Province)
 16- Atrak Bojnourd (Khorasan Shomali Province)
 17- Jahan Electric Nishapur(Khorasan Razavi Province)
 18- Shahrdari Ferdows (Khorasan Jonoobi Province)
 19- Esteghlal Ramhormoz (Khuzestan Province)
 20- Shahrdari Gachsaran (Kohgiluyeh and Boyer-Ahmad Province)
 21- Persepolis Kamyaran (Kurdistan Province)
 22- Gahar Zagros Novin (Lorestan Province)
 23- Poomer Saveh (Markazi Province)
 24- Khazar Mahmoudabad (Mazandaran Province)
 25- Takmehr Takestan (Qazvin Province)
 26- Salafchegan Qom (Qom Province)
 27- Ansar Siman Shahrood (Semnan Province)
 28- Shimi Zabol (Sistan and Baluchistan Province)
 29- Misagh Sepah Taft (Yazd Province)
 30- Aria Khorramdarreh (Zanjan Province)
 31- Miaad Shahriar Tehran (Tehran Province)
 32- Shahid Vahid Pakdasht (Tehran Province / Tavabe)
 33- Kish-Air Kish (Kish Island)
 34- Yadavaran Khoramshahr (Khoramshahr)

Group 2  (Start their matches from the first round)

 In total 20 teams (Some of the teams playing in 2nd Division League):

 1- Mantagheh Vizheh Bandar Abbas
 2- Ashian Gostar Varamin
 3- Badr Hormozgan
 4- Choka Talesh
 5- Datis Lorestan
 6- Esteghlal Ahvaz
 7- Zob Ahan Novin Isfahan
 8- Foolad Novin
 9- Giti Pasand Isfahan
 10- Gostaresh Foolad Sahand
 11- Hafari Ahvaz
 12- Mehr Karaj
 13- Moghavemat Tehran
 14- Pas Novin Hamedan
 15- Payam Mashhad
 16- Sanat Naft Novin
 17- Sepidrood Rasht
 18- Pershiaan Zanjan
 19- Shamoushak Noshahr
 20- Siah Jamegan Khorasan

Group 3  (Start their matches from the second round)

 In total 28 teams (All teams playing in Azadegan League):

 1- Aboomoslem Khorasan
 2- Aluminium Hormozgan
 3- Bargh Shiraz
 4- Parseh Tehran
 5- Esteghlal Khuzestan
 6- Etka Gorgan
 7- Foolad Yazd
 8- Gahar Zagros
 9- Gol Gohar Sirjan
 10- Gostaresh Foolad Tabriz
 11- Iranjavan Bushehr
 12- Machine Sazi Tabriz
 13- Mes Rafsanjan
 14- Naft Masjed Soleyman
 15- Nassaji Mazandaran
 16- Nirooye Zamini
 17- Pas Hamedan
 18- Payam Mokhaberat Shiraz
 19- Paykan Qazvin
 20- Saipa Shomal
 21- Sanat Sari
 22- Sanati Kaveh Tehran
 23- Steel Azin Semnan
 24- Shahrdari Arak
 25- Shahrdari Bandar Abbas
 26- Shahrdari Yasuj
 27- Shirin Faraz Kermanshah
 28- Tarbiat Yazd

Group 4  (Start their matches from the fourth round)

 In total 18 teams (All teams playing in Iran Pro League):

 1- Damash Gilan
 2- Esteghlal
 3- Foolad
 4- Mes Kerman
 5- Malavan
 6- Mes Sarcheshme
 7- Moghavemat Sepasi
 8- Naft Tehran
 9- Persepolis
 10- Rah Ahan
 11- Saba
 12- Saipa
 13- Sanat Naft Abadan
 14- Sepahan
 15- Shahin Bushehr
 16- Shahrdari Tabriz
 17- Tractor Sazi
 18- Zob Ahan

First stage
In the First Stage of “2011–12 Hazfi Cup”, 82 teams will be presented. In this stage three rounds will be done, and finally, 14 teams will be qualified for the Second Stage.

The first round will be started with 52 teams. From this round, 26 teams are allowed to go to the second round. These 26 teams together with the other 30 teams (totally 56 teams) will play in the second round. The winners of second round will play in the third round, and finally, 14 teams will go through the Second Stage (fourth round).

First round

Second round

Third round

Second stage
From this stage the 18 teams from Iran Pro League will be entered into the Main Draw and together with 14 teams from the third round, will start their matches in the fourth round (1/16 Final - Last 32). The 16 winners will continue their matches in a normal draw.

Fourth round (round of 32)

Fifth round (round of 16)

Quarter-Final (1/4 Final - Last 8)

Semi-final (1/2 final – last 4)

Final

 The Final was played in a single match

Bracket 

Note:     H: Home team,   A: Away team

See also 
 2011–12 Persian Gulf Cup
 2011–12 Azadegan League
 2011–12 Iran Football's 2nd Division
 2011–12 Iran Football's 3rd Division
 Iranian Super Cup
 2011–12 Iranian Futsal Super League

References

Hazfi Cup seasons
Hazfi Cup
Hazfi Cup